Henri Dikongué (born 6 December 1967) is a Cameroonian singer and guitarist.

Dikongué was born in Douala to a family of musicians.  He attended a music school in Paris, where he attempted unsuccessfully to release a first album. He started a music and acting troupe and worked with actor Martin Yog and musicians Alfred M'Bongo and Manuel Wandji, as well as Maranatha, a South African chorus.

After finally choosing to settle in Paris in 1989, he perfected his skills with classical guitar and collaborated with African musicians such as Manu Dibango and Papa Wemba. In 1995 he released his first album, Wa.  His music mixes elements from makossa, bikutsi, reggae and rumba. He sings in his native tongue, Duala.

His second album, C'est la Vie, was released in 1997 (in the US under the Tinder Records label) and sold about 10,000 copies.  Between 1997 and 1998, he toured Germany and the United States.

His third album, N'oublie jamais, was released in 2000.  This album incorporated more musical styles such as reggae and flamenco, but the album wasn't as successful as his previous works.

Discography 

 Wa (1995)
 C'est la Vie (1997)
 N'oublie jamais (Never forget) (2000)
 Biso Nawa (2005)
 Diaspora (2016)

References

External links 
Official website of Henri Dikongué
Biography (French)
National Geographic

1967 births
Living people
Cameroonian guitarists
21st-century Cameroonian male singers
20th-century Cameroonian male singers